The Carthage Film Festival (CFF) is an annual film festival that takes place in Tunis and founded in 1966. It is also called by its abbreviation JCC, from its French name, or by its Arabic title,  (Cinema Days of Carthage).  Initially biennial alternating with the Carthage Theatre Festival, the festival became an annual event in 2014. A directing committee chaired by the Tunisian Ministry of Culture, joined with professionals of the cinema industry, is in charge of the organization.       

The Carthage Film Festival has been designed as a film festival engaged in the cause of African and Arab countries and enhancing the South cinema in general.

The main prize awarded is the Golden Tanit named after the Carthaginian goddess Tanit. Opening and closing ceremonies are held in the Théâtre municipal de Tunis (Municipal Theater of Tunis).

The Festival's current executive director is Sonia Chamkhi. 

The Festival's 33d edition is taking place 29 October through 5 November, 2022.

History

Conceived by filmmaker Tahar Cheriaa and officially launched in 1966 by the Tunisian Minister of Culture, Chedli Klibi, this event, the first of its kind in the Arab world, was primarily conceived to highlight sub-Saharan African and Arab cinema, creating bridges of dialogue between North and South and offering a meeting between regional filmmakers and moviegoers.        
Klibi said:

Numerous prominent African and Arab filmmakers have first been recognized at Carthage before going on to receive broader recognition, including the Senegalese Sembene Ousmane (Grand Prize 1966)  Egyptian Youssef Chahine (Grand Prize 1970), Malian Souleymane Cissé (Grand Prize 1982), the Palestinian Michel Khleifi (Grand Prize 1988), Tunisians Taïeb Louhichi (1st Tunisian Golden Tanit for short film 1972)  Nouri Bouzid, Ferid Boughedir, and Moufida Tlatli (Grand Prize 1986, 1990, 1994), the Syrian Mohammad Malas (Grand Prize 1992) and Algerian Merzak Allouache (Grand Prize 1996).

The festival's social dimension is reflected in several GoldenTanit award-winning films such as the Making Of (2006) by Nouri Bouzid, featuring Bahta, a 25-year-old unemployed amateur break dancer recruited by extremists to commit a suicide attack.

It was at the Carthage Film Festival that FEPACI (Pan-African Federation of Filmmakers) was created in 1970, developing a foundation for South-South film cooperation.

Over the years the Carthage Film festival has introduced workshops, master classes and the Producer's Network to better support filmmakers. Prominent figures from the from the arts have served as jurors in the various official competitions.

Program and Awards

The official program includes several sections: the "Official Competition" and the "Panorama section" that are open to Arab and African films; the "International section" which is open to recent movies of high artistic quality; a "Tribute section" and "Workshop Projects" designed to encourage the development of Arab and African films projects by granting "help funds for scenario" and a competitive video section.

The official Selection 
The various sections of the Official Competition of the Carthage Film festival each present 12 films.

The official competition for feature films:    
This selection with three Tanit (Gold, Silver, Bronze) is the most visible part of the Carthage Film Festival and is the heart of the official selection. Twelve Arab and African films reflect the renewal of cinematographic expression and present original works singular in their aesthetic and their statements.

The official short film competition:      
As well as the competition dedicated to feature films, this selection allows to dedicate three Arab and African fiction films in short format (less than 30 minutes).

The documentary competition    
A Golden Tanit awards the  best documentary among twelve Arab and African films. The Prize Tahar Cheriaa for a first work: The Golden Tanit "Tahar Cheriaa" awards the first work of a filmmaker presented in the official selection: official Competition, competition of the first Arab and African film.

Carthage Ciné-Foundation: 
This international selection of twelve school films embodies the diversity of young artists and announces the trends of the future world cinema. A film will be awarded by the international jury.

Parallel sections

New Territories

This program aims to be a window on recent suggested films, the most innovative and subversive, the most radical and marginal, in a word, on new aesthetic and political experiences, far from any commercial format, media or festival. It seeks to submit the continually renewed ability of cinema to house within it both the issues of its time, the questions of those who make it and their contemporaries as well as the shifting of its artistic, formal and technological expression.

Tribute
Each edition pays tribute to a Tunisian filmmaker and several international filmmakers offering the public a retrospective of their films or debates meetings inspired by their career.

Carthage professional
Takmil
The Takmil workshop, namely "finish" in Arabic, which is in its second edition, aims to allows African and Arab films in post-production phase to be evaluated by an international jury of cinema professionals. For three days, working copies are viewed by the jury in the presence of the filmmakers which films have been selected. Screenings will be followed by a discussion allowing each participant to defend his film and benefit from an expertise.       
The workshop Takmil also aims to be a platform offering visibility to young African and Arab filmmaking. Visibility that will result in particular by the screening of the winning films, an African and Arab premiere during the Carthage Film Festival session following their finishing.

Producers Network    
The Producers Network hosts Arab and African producers present at the Carthage Film Festival and allows international film professionals to benefit from a series of meetings and specific events designed to encourage international co-production and optimize networking.        
With a 48-hour program, the Producers Network offers real opportunities to meet with potential partners with financing, co-production, distribution needs...

The Carthage Film Festival in regions

Since the 2014 session, the Carthage Film Festival has moved between different Tunisian cities. In 2015 ten cities hosted the festival: Jendouba, Sfax, Mahdia, Tataouine, Nabeul, Béja, Kef, Kairouan, Gafsa and Monastir.  The films are divided into three main sections:
 The films of the official selection: these films are screened in the evening during the festival period in each host city.
 European films: In partnership with the Journées du Cinéma Européen, a selection of European films are screened daily in different cities.      
 In partnership with UNICEF two children's movies are screened in each city.

Editions

References

External links

Carthage Film Festival official site

1966 establishments in Tunisia
Film festivals established in 1966
Film festivals in Tunisia
Events in Tunis